Kariapatti was former state assembly constituency in Virudhunagar district, Tamil Nadu, India. It existed from 1967 to 1971.

Members of Legislative Assembly

Election results

1971

1967

References

External links
 

Virudhunagar district
Former assembly constituencies of Tamil Nadu